Flight 1103 is an airline flight number that has had multiple accidents and incidents. It may refer to:

Libyan Arab Airlines Flight 1103, crashed on 22 December 1992; a mid-air collision involving a Boeing 727 and a Mikoyan-Gurevich MiG-23
AB Aviation Flight 1103, crashed on February 26, 2022; a plane crash in the Comoros involving a Cessna 208 Caravan

1103